Al-Karamah SC is a Syrian professional basketball club based in the city of Homs, that plays in the Syrian Basketball League. The team is part of the multi-sports club of the same name. In 2021, the Al-Karamah club won its first SBL title.

History

The club was founded in 1928 as Khalid Bin Walid Sports Club. Since 1971, the club has been called by its current name. In the 2014 season, after the first place in the regular season (Gr.A), the club under the leadership of coach Azzam Husain reached the SBL semifinals, where he lost to Al-Ittihad SC 74-93 and took the final 3rd place.

The first big success in the history of the club was participation in the final of the SBL in 2016 season, where they were defeated by Al-Jaish SC. In the 2021 season, led by coach Khaled Abu Toq, the team placed first in the regular season. In the semifinals, the team encountered Al-Ittihad SC, over which it won 2–1 in matches. In the SBL final, they met the Al-Wahda SC, which they beat 79–64 in the first match. In the third decisive match, they won mainly thanks to Omar Sheikh Ali, who became the MVP of the match, 74–51 over Wahda SC and won their first SBL title.

In the 2022 season, they finished third in the new Syrian Super Cup.

Club rivalries
The biggest rival and competitor of the club is Al-Wathba SC, with which they play the Homs city derby.

Honours
Syrian Basketball League
Winners (1): 2021
Runners-up (2): 2016 - 2022
Third place (1): 2014
Syrian Basketball Cup
Third place (1): 2022
Syrian Basketball Super Cup
Third place (2): 2021 - 2022

Current roster
Squad for the 2021/2022 Syrian Basketball League season:

References

Basketball in Syria
Sports clubs in Syria
Basketball teams in Syria
Basketball teams established in 1928
Sports clubs established in 1928